The Order of the Sun is a chivalric order of knights in India. The motto of the Order of the Sun is Yato Dharmastato Jai, meaning 'Where There is Virtue, There is Victory' and the badge of the Order of the Sun is an "eight-petalled flower in red enamel".

The designer of the decorations for the Order of the Sun was M.H.S. Spielman of Oxford.

In her 2017 bal des débutantes, Ava Phillippe took Padmanabh Singh as her date and as is customary with full evening dress, he was wearing the decoration of the Order of the Sun.

References 

Orders, decorations, and medals of India
History of Jaipur